Boulenophrys daweimontis, the Mount Dawei horned toad, is a species of frog in the family Megophryidae. It is only known from Mount Dawe) in Pingbian Miao Autonomous County, Yunnan, China, near the Vietnamese border. It is also likely to occur in the adjacent parts of Vietnam. Its natural habitats are subtropical or tropical moist montane forests and rivers. It is threatened by habitat loss.

References

daweimontis
Amphibians of China
Endemic fauna of Yunnan
Taxonomy articles created by Polbot
Amphibians described in 1997